Anahit (in Armenian Անահիտ) (in Western Armenian transliteration and pronunciation Anahid) is goddess of fertility and healing, wisdom and water in Iranian and Armenian mythology. 

Anahita is a Persian goddess, known also by the spellings Anahit/Anahid.

Anahit and variant Anahid is a common given name for Iranian and Armenian females, and may refer to:

Anahid 
(in Western Armenian given names)
 Anahid Ajemian (born 1924), Armenian-American violinist
 Anahid Fayad (born 1983), Syrian-born Palestinian-Jordanian actress
 Anaid Iplicjian (born 1935), German-Armenian actress 
 Anahide Ter Minassian (1929-2019), French-Armenian historian

Anahit 
(in Eastern Armenian given names)
 Anahit Bakhshyan (born 1947), Armenian politician and MP
 Anahit Maschyan (1900-1989), Armenian theatre and film actress
 Anahit Nersesyan (born 1954), Armenian pianist
 Anahit Perikhanian (1928–2012), Armenian Iranologist
 Anahit Sahinyan (1917–2010), Armenian writer
 Anahit Tsitsikian (1926–1999), Armenian violinist
 Anahit Yulanda Varan (1917–2003), Turkish street performer of Armenian ethnicity

See also
Anahita (given name)

References 

Armenian feminine given names